Immunosenescence is the gradual deterioration of the immune system, brought on by natural age advancement. A 2020 review concluded that the adaptive immune system is affected more than the innate immune system. Immunosenescence involves both the host's capacity to respond to infections and the development of long-term immune memory. Age-associated immune deficiency is found in both long- and short-lived species as a function of their age relative to life expectancy rather than elapsed time. It has been studied in animal models including mice, marsupials and monkeys. Immunosenescence is a contributory factor to the increased frequency of morbidity and mortality among the elderly. Along with anergy and T-cell exhaustion, immunosenescence belongs among the major immune system dysfunctional states. However, while T-cell anergy is a reversible condition, as of 2020 no techniques for immunosenescence reversal had been developed.

Immunosenescence is not a random deteriorative phenomenon, rather it appears to inversely recapitulate an evolutionary pattern. Most of the parameters affected by immunosenescence appear to be under genetic control. Immunosenescence can be envisaged as the result of the continuous challenge of the unavoidable exposure to a variety of antigens such as viruses and bacteria.

Age-associated decline in immune function 

Aging of the immune system is a controversial phenomenon. Senescence refers to replicative senescence from cell biology, which describes the condition when the upper limit of cell divisions (Hayflick limit) has been exceeded, and such cells commit apoptosis or lose their functional properties. Immunosenescence generally means a robust shift in both structural and functional parameters that has a clinically relevant outcome. Thymus involution is probably the most relevant factor responsible for immunosenescence. Thymic involution is common in most mammals; in humans it begins after puberty, as the immunological defense against most novel antigens is necessary mainly during infancy and childhood.

The major characteristic of the immunosenescent phenotype is a shift in T-cell subpopulation distribution. As the thymus involutes, the number of naive T cells (especially CD8+) decreases, thus naive T cells homeostatically proliferate into memory T cells as a compensation. It is believed that the conversion to memory phenotype can be accelerated by restimulation of the immune system by persistent pathogens such as CMV and HSV. By age 40, an estimated 50% to 85% of adults have contracted human cytomegalovirus (HCMV). Consistent, repeated stimulation by such pathogens leads to preferential differentiation of the T-cell memory phenotype, and a 2020 review reported that CD8+ T-cell precursors, specific for the most rare and less frequently present antigens shed the most. However, such a distribution shift leads to increased susceptibility to non-persistent infection, cancer, autoimmune diseases, cardiovascular health conditions and many others.

T cells are not the only immune cells affected by aging:

 Hematopoietic stem cells (HSC), which provide the regulated lifelong supply of leukocyte progenitors that differentiate into specialised immune cells diminish in their self-renewal capacity. This is due to the accumulation of oxidative damage to DNA by aging and cellular metabolic activity and telomeric shortening.
 The number of phagocytes declines in aged hosts, coupled with an intrinsic reduction of bactericidal activity.
 Natural killer (NK) cell cytotoxicity and the antigen-presenting function of dendritic cells diminishes with age. The age-associated impairment of dendritic antigen-presenting cells (APCs) translates into a deficiency in cell-mediated immunity and thus, the inability for effector T-lymphocytes to modulate an adaptive immune response.
 Humoral immunity declines, caused by a reduction in the population of antibody producing B-cells along with a smaller immunoglobulin diversity and affinity.

In addition to changes in immune responses, the beneficial effects of inflammation devoted to the neutralisation of dangerous and harmful agents early in life and in adulthood become detrimental late in life in a period largely not foreseen by evolution, according to the antagonistic pleiotropy theory of aging. Changes in the lymphoid compartment are not solely responsible for the malfunctioning of the immune system. Although myeloid cell production does not seem to decline with age, macrophages become dysregulated as a consequence of environmental changes.

T-cell biomarkers of age-dependent dysfunction 
T cells' functional capacity is most influenced by aging effects. Age-related alterations are evident in all T-cell development stages, making them a significant factor in immunosenescence. T-cell function decline begins with the progressive involution of the thymus, which is the organ essential for T-cell maturation. This decline in turn reduces IL-2 production and reduction/exhaustion on the number of thymocytes (i.e. immature T cells), thus reducing peripheral naïve T cell output. Once matured and circulating throughout the peripheral system, T cells undergo deleterious age-dependent changes. This leaves the body practically devoid of virgin T cells, which makes it more prone to a variety of diseases.
 shift in the CD4+/CD8+ ratio
the accumulation and clonal expansion of memory and effector T cells
 impaired development of CD4+ T follicular helper cells (specialized in facilitating peripheral B cell maturation, and the generation of antibody-producing plasma cells and memory B cells)
 deregulation of intracellular signal transduction capabilities
 diminished capacity to produce effector lymphokines
 shrinkage of antigen-recognition repertoire of T-cell receptor (TcR) diversity
 down-regulation of CD28 costimulatory molecules
cytotoxic activity of Natural Killer T cells (NKTs) decreases due to reduction of the expression of cytotoxicity activating receptors (NKp30, NKp46, etc.) and (simultaneously) increase in the expression of the inhibitory (KIR, NKG2C, etc.) receptors of NK cells
reduction of cytotoxic activity due to impaired expression of associated molecules such as IFN-γ, granzyme B or perforin
 impaired proliferation in response to antigenic stimulation
 accumulation and clonal expansion of memory and effector T cells
 hampered immune defences against viral pathogens, especially by cytotoxic CD8+ T cells
 changes in cytokine profile, e.g., increased pro-inflammatory cytokines milieu present in the elderly (IL-6)
increased PD-1 expression
glycolysis as a preferential pathway of energetic metabolism - functionally impaired mitochondria produce ROS excessively
presence of T cell-specific biomarkers of senescence (circular RNA100783, micro-RNAs MiR-181a)

Challenges 
The elderly frequently present with non-specific signs and symptoms, and clues of focal infection are often absent or obscured by chronic conditions. This complicates diagnosis and treatment.

Vaccination in the elderly 
The reduced efficacy of vaccination in the elderly stems from their restricted ability to respond to immunization with novel non-persistent pathogens, and correlates with both CD4:CD8 alterations and impaired dendritic cell function. Therefore, vaccination in earlier life stages seems more likely to be effective, although the duration of the effect varies by pathogen.

Rescue of the advanced-age phenotype 
Immune system aging in mice can be partly restricted by restoring thymus growth, which can be achieved by transplantation of proliferative thymic epithelial cells from young mice. Metformin has been proven to moderate aging in preclinical studies. Its protective effect is probably caused primarily by impaired mitochondria metabolism, particularly decreased reactive oxygen production or increased AMP:ATP ratio and lower NAD/NADH ratio. Coenzyme NAD+ is reduced in various tissues in an age-dependent manner, and thus redox potential associated changes seem to be critical in the aging process, and NAD+ supplements may have protective effects. Rapamycin, an antitumor and immunosuppresant, acts similarly.

References 

Ageing processes
Immunology
Senescence